Nelson Commonwealth Marine Reserve is a 6,123 km2 marine protected area within Australian waters located in the Southern Ocean near the South Australia-Victoria border. The reserve was established in 2007 and is part of the South-east Commonwealth Marine Reserve Network.

The reserve spans deepwater ecosystems (below ) and encloses geological features including plateaus, knolls, canyons and the abyssal plain. It is an important migration area for humpback, blue, fin and possibly sei whales.

Protection
The entirety of the Nelson marine reserve area is IUCN protected area category VI and is zoned as 'Special Purpose'.

See also

Commonwealth marine reserves
Protected areas of Australia
Great Australian Bight

Notes

References

External links
Nelson Commonwealth Marine Reserve Network website

South-east Commonwealth Marine Reserves Network
Protected areas established in 2007